Ioan Prundeanu (born 17 January 1993) is a Romanian rower. He competed in the 2020 Summer Olympics.

References

1993 births
Living people
Sportspeople from Bucharest
Rowers at the 2020 Summer Olympics
Romanian male rowers
Olympic rowers of Romania
Rowers at the 2010 Summer Youth Olympics